Sepmeries is a commune in the Nord department in northern France.

History
During World War I, intense action took place close to Sepmeries, including a dramatic incident described by A. S. Bullock in his posthumously published memoir, in which he narrowly escaped death by making a dash out of a practice trench where he and his comrades were trapped under bombardment.

Heraldry

See also
Communes of the Nord department

References

Communes of Nord (French department)